Arnaud Charles Paul Marie Philippe de Borchgrave (26 October 1926 – 15 February 2015) was a Belgian-American journalist who specialized in international politics. Following a long career with the news magazine Newsweek, covering 17 wars in 30 years as a foreign correspondent, he held key editorial and executive positions with The Washington Times and United Press International. Borchgrave was also a founding member of Newsmax Media.

Early life and family

Borchgrave was born in Brussels into the De Borchgrave d'Altena family. He was the son of Belgian Count Baudouin de Borchgrave d'Altena, later head of military intelligence for the Belgian government-in-exile during the Second World War, and his British wife Audrey Dorothy Louise Townshend. His mother was the daughter of Major General Sir Charles Townshend and his French wife, Alice Cahen d'Anvers, who was famously painted alongside her sister in Renoir's Pink and Blue. His maternal great-grandfather was Count Louis Cahen d'Anvers, a prominent French banker. He was a descendant of George Townshend, 1st Marquess Townshend, through his second son, Lord John Townshend.

Borchgrave was educated in Belgium, King's Canterbury, and the United States. As Belgium fell to the German invasion, he and his family escaped on a freighter, being rescued by a British destroyer after the freighter's captain had attempted to divert to Hamburg. He served in the British Royal Navy (1942–1946), from the age of 15, after running away from home, convincing his grandmother to assist in falsifying his age so he could enlist. He was awarded the Médaille Maritime by Belgium.

He gave up his Belgian title of nobility in 1951.

Newsweek career
In 1947, Borchgrave was appointed as the Brussels bureau manager for United Press, and in 1950 he became Newsweeks bureau chief in Paris, and then its chief correspondent. In 1953, he became a senior editor for the magazine. Osborn Elliott, former editor-in-chief of Newsweek, once said:
De Borchgrave has played a role in world affairs known to no other journalist. He has been able to tap the thinking of numerous world leaders... despite his intimacy with major policymakers, he has never aligned himself with either side of a dispute.... Arnaud de Borchgrave has made significant contributions to world peace and understanding. CSIS Press Release
As a correspondent for Newsweek, Borchgrave secured several interviews with world leaders. In 1969, he interviewed both President Gamal Abdel Nasser of Egypt and Prime Minister Levi Eshkol of Israel. In October 1972, during the Vietnam War, he secured his most famous interview, travelling to Hanoi to speak with Prime Minister and Politburo member Pham Van Dong of North Vietnam. In that interview, Dong described a provision of a proposed peace deal as a "coalition of transition," which raised fears in South Vietnam that the deal involved a coalition government and may have played a role in South Vietnam's rejection of the deal.

Later career
Appointed editor-in-chief for The Washington Times on 20 March 1985, Borchgrave also went on to serve in the late 1990s as CEO of a much-diminished United Press International, the successor to his early-career employer, during the latter part of the agency's ownership by a group of Saudi investors. In that role, Borchgrave orchestrated UPI's exit from its last major media niche, the broadcast news business that United Press had initiated in the 1930s. He maintained that "what was brilliant pioneering work on the part of UPI prior to World War II, with radio news, is now a static quantity and so far as I'm concerned, certainly doesn't fit into my plans for the future." He sought to shift UPI's dwindling resources into Internet-based delivery of newsletter services, focusing more on technical and diplomatic specialties than on general news. The rump UPI thus sold their client list of its still-significant radio network and broadcast wire to its former rival, the AP.

The following year, Borchgrave played a key role in the sale of the further downsized UPI to News World Communications, the international news media company founded in 1976 by Unification Church leader Sun Myung Moon, who was also the founder of The Washington Times for which Borchgrave had worked earlier.

After his CEO turn at UPI, Borchgrave became "Editor-at-Large" of The Washington Times and UPI, writing regular columns published by either or both and retaining associations with both Unification Church media outlets. He also served as Project Director for Transnational Threats (TNT) and Senior Advisor for the Center for Strategic and International Studies. He was a contributor to The Globalist, a daily online magazine.

According to Morley Safer's "Flashbacks", Borchgrave testified before Senator Jeremiah Denton's subcommittee in 1981 that Pham Xuan An, a Time employee and Viet Cong spy based in Saigon, "was an agent whose mission was to disinform the Western press".  An denied to Safer that he planted disinformation, saying that his Viet Cong bosses thought it would be too obvious and that they preferred he feed them information instead.

Borchgrave was a founding member of Newsmax Media. He also belonged to the Foreign Policy Association, occasionally appearing as a panelist in their videos and events.

Arnaud de Borchgrave interviewed many heads of state, heads of government, monarchs, and key figures of the world, including his most famous one when he and UPI International Consultant Ammar Turabi interviewed Mullah Omar three months before 9/11. This interview offered significant insight for decision and policy makers globally and has been published in different print media multiple times since 2001. UPI considers it as one of its best achievements and included it in UPI's 100 Years of Excellence. This is the only interview with Mullah Omar to be conducted and published.

Borchgrave was the co-author, with Robert Moss, of the best-selling novel The Spike (1980).

Plagiarism allegations 

On 17 May 2012, Erik Wemple, a blogger for The Washington Post, reported that Borchgrave's columns in The Washington Times reflected his think tank work and raised questions about the originality of some of his writing, citing similarities between elements of his columns and other published material. Wemple included Borchgrave's explanations for those, but also the doubts expressed about the similarities by some of the other organizations involved. Elsewhere, the news website Salon reported that anonymous Washington Times officials claimed that the paper had known about Borchgrave's plagiarism nearly a year before Wemple's investigation and had initially discontinued his column before resuming it without any disciplinary action.

Borchgrave denied the allegations and claimed that his column was suspended because he was on book leave. The Washington Times then announced that Borchgrave would take a hiatus to complete work on his memoirs while the paper conducted an inquiry into his work. Some of Borchgrave's latest columns were removed from the Washington Times website. The Center for Strategic and International Studies also announced its own investigation of work Borchgrave had published under its name.

French Legion of Honor award 
In July 2014, Borchgrave was awarded a knighthood in france's the Legion of Honour.

Personal life
In 1969, following two earlier marriages, Borchgrave married Alexandra Villard, daughter of the ambassador and author Henry Serrano Villard. She is also a published author, including a biography of her great-grandfather, the railroad tycoon Henry Villard. Borchgrave died of bladder cancer in Washington, D.C. at the age of 88. He was a member of the Metropolitan Club of Washington D.C.

In media
Borchgrave has been featured on several TV and Internet shows, including Weekend World, The Bob Braun Show, The Tonight Show Starring Johnny Carson, The McLaughlin Group, Paula Zahn Now, and James Goodale's Digital Age.

He appeared as himself in a 1984 U.S. Information Agency report titled Soviet Active Measures.

Publications

Books
 The Spike (1980), with Robert Moss. New York: Crown Publishers. .
 Monimbó (1963), with Robert Moss. New York: Simon and Schuster. .

Reports
 Cyber Threats and Information Security: Meeting the 21st Century Challenge (May 2001). Washington, D.C.: Center for Strategic International Studies. .

See also

 Legion of Honour
 Legion of Honour Museum 
 List of Legion of Honour recipients by name (A)
 Ribbons of the French military and civil awards

References

External links
FBI file at Internet Archive

American reporters and correspondents
American magazine journalists
Newsweek people
The Washington Times people
20th-century American newspaper editors
20th-century American novelists
American male journalists
People involved in plagiarism controversies
American male novelists
American spy fiction writers
Royal Navy personnel of World War II
Belgian emigrants to the United States
1926 births
2015 deaths
Deaths from cancer in Washington, D.C.
Deaths from bladder cancer
Belgian people of French descent
American people of French-Jewish descent
American people of English descent
Belgian people of English descent
Belgian journalists
Male journalists
Belgian nobility
Recipients of the Médaille militaire (France)
20th-century American male writers
Burials at Rock Creek Cemetery